Brent Woods (1855 – March 31, 1906) was an African American Buffalo Soldier in the United States Army and a recipient of America's highest military decoration—the Medal of Honor—for his actions in the Indian Wars of the western United States.

Biography

Woods was born a slave in Pulaski County, Kentucky and freed at the age of 8. He joined the US Army from Louisville, Kentucky in October 1873 at the age of 18 (although initially claiming to be 23) and was assigned to Company B of the 9th Cavalry Regiment. On August 19, 1881, he participated in a battle at Gavilan Canyon in New Mexico against Chief Nana and a small band of Apaches. After the deaths of six men in his cavalry, including his lieutenant, Woods took command and fought to save the lives of many of his comrades. Thirteen years later, on July 12, 1894, Sergeant Woods was awarded the Medal of Honor for his actions during the engagement. He retired from the army in November 1902 and returned to Somerset. Woods died in 1906 at the age of 50 or 51 and was buried in an unmarked grave at the First Baptist Church of Somerset.

Knowledge of Sergeant Woods' achievements remained largely obscured until 1982 when Lorraine Smith of Somerset started a campaign to mark Woods' grave. On June 20, 1984, the US Army exhumed Woods' remains and gave him a full military funeral on October 28. His grave can be found in section A, grave 930 of Mill Springs National Cemetery, Nancy, Kentucky.

Medal of Honor citation
Rank and organization: Sergeant, Company B, 9th U.S. Cavalry. Place and date: New Mexico, August 19, 1881. Entered service at: Louisville, Ky. Birth: Pulaski County, Ky. Date of issue: July 12, 1894.

Citation
Saved the lives of his comrades and citizens of the detachment.

See also

List of Medal of Honor recipients
List of Medal of Honor recipients for the Indian Wars
List of African American Medal of Honor recipients

Notes

References

External links

American people of the Indian Wars
United States Army Medal of Honor recipients
People from Pulaski County, Kentucky
United States Army soldiers
Buffalo Soldiers
1855 births
1906 deaths
American Indian Wars recipients of the Medal of Honor
19th-century American slaves